Cvetulja is a village in Serbia. It is situated in the Krupanj municipality, in the Mačva District of Central Serbia. The village had a Serb ethnic majority and a population of 274 in 2002.

Historical population

1948: 687
1953: 680
1961: 588
1971: 513
1981: 435
1991: 298
2002: 274

References

See also
List of places in Serbia

Populated places in Mačva District